Neoraimondia is a genus of medium to large cacti from Peru. The genus is named after the Italian-born Peruvian explorer, naturalist, and scientist, Antonio Raimondi. It is a psychoactive cactus and its different species have been known to contain the chemicals 3,5-Dimethoxy-4-hydroxyphenethylamine and 3,4-Dimethoxyphenethylamine. It is mixed into a hallucinogenic beverage called "cimora" along with Echinopsis pachanoi (syn. Trichocereus pachanoi).

Species
, Plants of the World Online accepted two species:

References 

Cactoideae genera
Cactoideae